Tribes of Caïn is a Swiss heavy metal band, formed in 1999, with three albums released. They cite their music as a mixture of black, death and thrash metal.

Current members
Sven Gryspeerdt – vocals
Reto Hofstetter – guitar
Chrigi Sennhauser – guitar
Dario Stutz – bass
Dave Schlumpf – drums

Discography
 The First Born (2003)
 Supra Absurdum (2004)
 Retaliation  (2007)

References

External links 
 Tribes of Caïn - official Website
 Tribes of Caïn | Listen and Stream Free Music, Albums, New Releases, Photos, Videos

Musical groups established in 1999
Swiss heavy metal musical groups
Swiss black metal musical groups
Swiss death metal musical groups
Swiss thrash metal musical groups
1999 establishments in Switzerland